Thank Heavens for Dale Evans is the debut studio album by American country music band the Dixie Chicks. The group's original membership of Robin Lynn Macy, Laura Lynch, Martie Erwin, and Emily Erwin (whose names were changed to Martie Maguire and Emily Strayer upon marriage), would survive intact for only this album and the following Little Ol' Cowgirl, from 1989 to 1992, before first Macy, and then Lynch departed and the current vocalist, Natalie Maines assumed the vocalist position in 1995, creating the trio that became the highly successful band which found great fame in 1998 and remain popular with a large following to this day.

Track listing

Personnel

Dixie Chicks
Robin Lynn Macy - guitar, vocals, harmony
Laura Lynch - bass, vocals, harmony
Martie Erwin - fiddle, viola, harmony
Emily Erwin - banjo, harmony

Additional personnel
Dave Peters - mandolin

References

1990 debut albums
The Chicks albums